Vigone is a comune (municipality) in the Metropolitan City of Turin in the Italian region Piedmont, located about  southwest of Turin. 

Vigone borders the following municipalities: Buriasco, Virle Piemonte, Cercenasco, Macello, Pancalieri, Cavour, and Villafranca Piemonte.

Twin towns — sister cities
Vigone is twinned with:

  Cañada Rosquín, Argentina

References

External links
 Official website

Cities and towns in Piedmont